Université de Thiès (UT - University of Thiès) is located in Thiès, Senegal. It was founded in 2007.

References

External links 
Université de Thiès official website 

Universities in Senegal
French West Africa
Educational institutions established in 2007
2007 establishments in Senegal